Ordinary Organizations: Why Normal Men Carried Out the Holocaust is a book by German sociologist . It was originally published in German, as Ganz normale Organisationen. Zur Soziologie des Holocaust, in 2014. It was translated into English by Jessica Spengler in 2016.

References

Further reading

Sociology books
2014 non-fiction books
Suhrkamp Verlag books